Calvados is a brandy from Normandy in France, made from apples or pears, or from apples with pears.

History

In France

Apple orchards and brewers are mentioned as far back as the 8th century by Charlemagne. The first known record of Norman distillation was made by squire Gilles de Gouberville in 1553, and the guild for cider distillation was created about 50 years later in 1606. In the 17th century, the traditional cider farms expanded, but taxation and prohibition of cider brandies were enforced elsewhere than Brittany, Maine, and Normandy. The area called "Calvados" was created after the French Revolution, but eau de vie de cidre was already called calvados in common usage. In the 19th century, output increased with industrial distillation and the working class fashion for café-calva. When a phylloxera outbreak in the last quarter of the 19th century devastated the vineyards of France and Europe, Calvados experienced a golden age. During World War I, cider brandy was requisitioned to make explosives for the armament industry due to its alcohol content. The appellation contrôlée regulations officially gave AOC Calvados Pays d'Auge a protected name in 1942. After the war, many cider houses and distilleries were reconstructed, mainly in the Pays d'Auge. Many of the traditional farmhouse structures were replaced by modern agriculture with high output. The calvados appellation system was revised in 1984 and 1996. Pommeau got its recognition in 1991; in 1997, an appellation for Domfront with 30% pears was created.

Elsewhere
Cider brandy is also made in the UK, and appears in records going back to 1678. Somerset cider brandy gained European protected geographical indication (PGI) status in 2011.

Production

Calvados is distilled from cider made from specially grown and selected apples, from over 200 named varieties. It is not uncommon for a calvados producer to use over 100 specific varieties of apples  which are either sweet (such as the 'Rouge Duret' variety), tart (such as the 'Rambault' variety), or bitter (such as the 'Mettais', 'Saint Martin', 'Frequin', and 'Binet Rouge' varieties), the latter being inedible.

The fruit is harvested and pressed into a juice that is fermented into a dry cider. It is then distilled into eau de vie. After two or three years of aging in oak casks, it can be sold as calvados. The longer it is aged, the smoother the drink becomes. Usually, the maturation goes on for several years.

Double and single distillation

The appellation of AOC (appellation d'origine contrôlée) for calvados authorizes double distillation for all calvados, but it is required for the Calvados Pays d'Auge.

 Double distillation is carried out in a traditional alembic pot still, called either l'alambic à repasse or charentais
 Single continuous distillation in a column still

The usual arguments for and against the two processes are that the former process gives the spirit complexity and renders it suitable for longer aging, whilst the latter process gives the calvados a fresh and clean apple flavour but with less complexity. In fact, a growing belief indicates a well-operated column still can produce as complex and "age-able" calvados as double distillation.

Producing regions and legal definitions

Like many French wines, calvados is governed by appellation contrôlée regulations. The three appellations for calvados are:

 The AOC calvados area includes all of the Calvados, Manche, and Orne departments and parts of Eure, Mayenne, Sarthe, and Eure-et-Loir.
 AOC calvados makes up over 70% of the total production.
 A minimum of two years aging in oak barrels is required.
 The terroir, geographical area, is defined.
 The apples and pears are defined cider varieties.
 The procedures in production, such as pressing, fermentation, distillation, and ageing, are regulated.
 Usually, single-column distillation is used.
 The more restrictive AOC calvados Pays d'Auge area is limited to the east end of the department of Calvados and a few adjoining districts.
 Extensive quality control, the basic rules for AOC calvados together with several additional requirements, is practiced.
 Aging for a minimum of two years in oak barrels is required.
 Double distillation in an alembic pot-still is used.
 It must be produced within the designated area in Pays d'Auge.
 A minimum of six weeks of fermentation of the cider is required.
 Flavour elements are controlled.

 AOC calvados Domfrontais reflects the long tradition of pear orchards in the area, resulting in a unique fruity calvados. The regulation is similar to the AOC calvados and the column still is used.
 A minimum of 30% pears from the designated areas is used.
 A three-year minimum of aging in oak barrels is required.
 The orchards must consist of at least 15% pear trees (25% from the 16th harvest).
 Fermier calvados ("farm-made") – some quality-minded producers both inside and outside the Pays d'Auge make "fermier calvados", which indicates the calvados is entirely made on the farm in a traditional agricultural way according to high quality demands.

Grades of quality
The age on the bottle refers to the youngest constituent of the blend. A blend is often composed of old and young calvados. Producers can also use the terms below to refer to the age.

 "VS", Trois étoiles ***, and Trois pommes must be at least two years old.
 Vieux or Réserve must be at least three years old.
 "V.O." "VO", Vieille Réserve, "V.S.O.P.", or "VSOP" must be at least four years old.
 "Extra", "X.O." "XO", "Napoléon", Hors d'Age, Tres Vieille Reserve must be at least six years old, but are often sold much older.

High-quality calvados usually has parts which are much older than that mentioned. Calvados can be made from a single (generally, exceptionally good) year. When this happens, the label often carries that year.

Tasting

Calvados is the basis of the tradition of le trou Normand, or "the Norman hole". This is a small drink of calvados taken between courses in a very long meal, sometimes with apple or pear sorbet, supposedly to reawaken the appetite. Calvados can be served as an apéritif, blended in drinks, between meals, as a digestif, or with coffee. Well-made calvados should naturally be reminiscent of apples and pears, balanced with flavours of aging. The less-aged calvados distinguishes itself with its fresh apple and pear aromas. The longer the calvados is aged, the more the taste resembles that of any other aged brandy. As calvados ages, it may become golden or darker brown with orange elements and red mahogany. The nose and palate are delicate with concentration of aged apples and dried apricots balanced with butterscotch, nut, and chocolate aromas.

In the Canadian Forces
Calvados is the regimental drink of The Queen's Own Rifles of Canada, The Royal Regina Rifles, The Royal Canadian Hussars, Le Régiment de Hull, Le Régiment de Maisonneuve, and The Sherbrooke Hussars. The troops were given Calvados as the units passed through Normandy following the D-Day invasion. Known as le trou normand, it is normally taken between courses at a regimental dinner, or during a toast to remember fallen soldiers.

Ice cream
Calvados can also be combined with ice cream for a dessert known as Coupe Normande.

See also

 Angel Face, a cocktail involving calvados
 Lambig, a similar drink from Brittany
 Somerset Cider Brandy, a similar English drink
 Applejack (beverage), a similar American drink

References

External links

Apple brandies
Fruit brandies
Cider
Distilled ciders
French distilled drinks
Norman cuisine